Michael Maurice Leadbetter (1946–2009) was a rugby union international, & rugby league player, who represented England in 1970.

Early life
Mike Leadbetter was born on 25 July 1946 in Southport. Mike was the younger of two brothers, and his family is one with deep roots in the Southport area, predating the construction of Southport itself. Mike was known to have been very proud of his family's roots in the fishing and farmworking of the area. However, both he and his brother Alan, who was to become a physicist, did not follow their forebears. He attended Ladybarn, a local secondary modern school, and left in 1961 aged 15, without qualifications. After a few years he began his first career in printing and followed this through a series apprenticeships leading to a diploma in management and print technology from Manchester College of Art and Design.

Rugby career
Leadbetter played his club rugby for Broughton Park, and made his international début on 18 April 1970 at Colombes in the France vs England match, that was won by France. Along with Broughton Park team mate Tony Neary, he was also part of a famous North West Counties team which defeated the All Blacks, 16-14, in Workington in 1972.

Described as a giant of a man, he also played 35 times for Lancashire. Leadbetter subsequently switched to rugby league going to Rochdale Hornets.

References

1946 births
2009 deaths
Alumni of Manchester Metropolitan University
Alumni of the University of Manchester
Deaths from cancer in England
England international rugby union players
English rugby league players
English rugby union players
Lancashire County RFU players
Rochdale Hornets players
Rugby league players from Southport
Rugby union locks
Rugby union players from Southport